The Teltow Canal, also known as the  in German, is a canal to the south of Berlin, the capital city of Germany. The canal lies in both the states of Berlin and Brandenburg, and at points forms the boundary between the two. It takes its name from the Brandeburgian region of Teltow and town of Teltow which lie on its course. The canal was constructed between 1900 and 1906, when it was opened by Wilhelm II.

The Dahme provides a link to the Oder-Spree Canal, and hence to the River Oder and Poland. Whilst the Dahme is a tributary of the River Spree, itself a navigable tributary of the Havel, the Teltow Canal offers the advantage of bypassing the centre of Berlin, with its heavy river traffic.

At its western end, the Teltow Canal incorporates the Griebnitzsee lake which links to the Havel in Potsdam. The Griebnitz Canal provides a second link to the Havel from the eastern end of the Griebnitzsee. Towards its eastern end, the Teltow Canal is linked to the Landwehr Canal by the  Neukölln Ship Canal, while the Britz Canal connects the Teltow Canal with the Spree.

There is only one lock on the canal, at Kleinmachnow.

References

External links 

Canals in Brandenburg
Canals in Berlin
Federal waterways in Germany
Buildings and structures in Neukölln
Buildings and structures in Steglitz-Zehlendorf
Buildings and structures in Tempelhof-Schöneberg
Canals opened in 1906
CTeltow
CTeltow
1906 establishments in Germany